Samuel Adolphus Cartwright (November 3, 1793 – May 2, 1863) was an American physician who practiced in Mississippi and Louisiana in the antebellum United States. Cartwright is best known as the inventor of the 'mental illness' of drapetomania, the desire of a slave for freedom, and an outspoken critic of germ theory.

Biography 
Cartwright married Mary Wren of Natchez, Mississippi, in 1825. During the American Civil War, he was a physician in the Confederate States Army and served in camps near Vicksburg and Port Hudson. He was assigned with improving the sanitary conditions for the soldiers.

Slavery 
The Medical Association of Louisiana charged Cartwright with investigating "the diseases and physical peculiarities of the negro race". His report was delivered as a speech at its annual meeting on March 12, 1851, and published in its journal. The most sensationalistic portions of it, on drapetomania and dysaesthesia aethiopica, were reprinted in DeBow's Review. He subsequently prepared an abbreviated version, with sources cited, for Southern Medical Reports.

"If they nonetheless became dissatisfied with their condition, they should be whipped to prevent them from running away." In describing his theory and cure for drapetomania, Cartwright relied on passages of Christian scripture dealing with slavery.

Cartwright also invented another 'disorder', dysaesthesia aethiopica, a disease "affecting both mind and body." Cartwright used his theory to explain the perceived lack of work ethic among slaves. Dysaesthesia aethiopica, "called by overseers 'rascality'," was characterized by partial insensitivity of the skin and "so great a hebetude of the intellectual faculties, as to be like a person half asleep." Other symptoms included "lesions of the body discoverable to the medical observer, which are always present and sufficient to account for the symptoms."

According to Cartwright, dysaesthesia aethiopica was "much more prevalent among free negroes living in clusters by themselves, than among slaves on our plantations, and attacks only such slaves as live like free negroes in regard to diet, drinks, exercise, etc." — indeed, according to Cartwright, "nearly all [free negroes] are more or less afflicted with it, that have not got some white person to direct and to take care of them."

Cultural depictions 

Cartwright was referenced in the 2004 film C.S.A.: The Confederate States of America. In the film, after the Confederate States of America wins the American Civil War, Cartwright's work forms the basis for the fictional Cartwright Institute for Freedom Illnesses, a medical school incorporating his theory on drapetomania and other "negro peculiarities".
Cartwright is also portrayed in the 1971 Mondo exploitation film Goodbye Uncle Tom alongside many other figures from the time. Notably, Cartwright is stated to be Jewish in the film, which he was not in reality.

Publications

References

Citations

Sources 

 "Samuel Adolphus Cartwright", A Dictionary of Louisiana Biography, Vol. 1 (1988), p. 157
Dictionary of American Medical Biography", Vol. 1 (1984)
 
 
 
 
 Mary Louise Marshall, "Samuel A. Cartwright and States' Rights Medicine," New Orleans Medical and Surgical Journal, XC (1940–1941).

 Further reading 
 
 

 External links 
 Drapetomania, the original article as printed in The New Orleans Medical and Surgical Journal''. (Google Books)

1793 births
1863 deaths
Writers from New Orleans
People from Fairfax County, Virginia
Confederate States Army surgeons
19th-century American writers
People from Huntsville, Alabama
American proslavery activists
People from Natchez, Mississippi
Proponents of scientific racism
People of Louisiana in the American Civil War
Perelman School of Medicine at the University of Pennsylvania alumni
Activists from Alabama
American slave owners